The city of Chennai in Tamil Nadu, India is administered by the Corporation of Chennai headed by a Mayor. The Mayor is the first citizen of the city. The person is the chief of the Chennai Municipal Corporation.  The Chennai Municipal Corporation has a history of 323 years and the Office of Mayor was formed in 1933. The corporation has been served by 48 different mayors as of 2012. Priya Rajan is the current mayor chennai.

The city is divided into 200 wards, each of them headed by a councillors who work under the Mayor. In addition to the 200 councilors, there are Deputy Commissioners and Heads of various departments and 15 Zonal officers.

First mayoralty
The Corporation of Madras, the second oldest in the British Empire and the first outside the United Kingdom, was inaugurated on 29 September 1688 based on a Charter issued by James II, King of England. As per the provisions of the charter, Nathaniel Higginson, a member of the Fort St George Council, was appointed first mayor of the city. Higginson resigned after six months and was succeeded by John Littleton. Interrupted between 1746 and 1753 by the brief French occupation of Madras, the post of mayor survived with minor amendments till 1798.

The mayoralty of Madras was amended by the Charter of George I of 1727, Charter II of 1753 and the Company's Charter of 1787. Elections to the office were held annually - from 1688 to 1726, the appointment was made on 29 September, from 1727 to 1753, on 20 December and from 1753 to 1798, on the first Tuesday of every December. From 1798 the Mayor and Aldermen sat in the Recorder's Court until 1801, when that Court was merged in the Supreme Court of Judicature. The post of mayor was revived only in 1933.

List of Mayors

Source:

Presidents

Between 1793 and 1856, municipal administration was in the control of Justices of Peace who also had judicial powers in the city. In 1856, the positions were abolished as per the Madras City Municipal Act XIV of 1856. The judges were replaced with three Municipal Commissioners from the civil service. The commissioners collected municipal taxes and enacted laws for the conservancy and improvement of the city. However, the system failed due to lack of financial accountability and the Municipal Corporation was revived in 1860 by the efforts of Sir Charles Trevelyan, Governor of Madras.
 
From 1886 onwards, a President was appointed to head the corporation and perform the duties of a mayor. The first President of the Corporation was  Lieutenant-Colonel G. M. J. Moore, who was then serving as Military Secretary to the Governor of Madras. Presidents were generally appointed for a four-year term but this was reduced to one in 1910. Civil servant T. Raghavaiah was the first Indian to act as President of the Madras Corporation. The first to be appointed as full-time President was T. Vijayaraghavacharya in 1916. P. Theagaraya Chetty of the Justice Party, appointed in 1919, was the first to represent a political party.

Mayors

Footnotes

Notes

References

External links
 Official website

Chennai

Mayors
Chennai Mayors
Mayors of Chennai